Pataskala is a city in Licking County, Ohio, United States, approximately  east of Columbus. The population was 14,962 at the 2010 census. Pataskala was a small community until 1996, when what was then the village of Pataskala merged with Lima Township, vastly increasing its population and geographic area.

History
Pataskala was laid out in 1851 when the railroad was extended to that point. "Pataskala" is a name derived from the Delaware language. A post office has been in operation at Pataskala since 1852. 

Pataskala was originally called Conine Town, after an early settler of the area, Richard Conine, and his wife Sarah (Van Dorn) Conine. Born in New Jersey, the Conines purchased over 2000 acres in Lima Township, permanently settling in the area in 1821. Conine had sold most of his land by 1850, and in 1851 he laid out plots for Conine Town. Another early settler, Jess Stoneman Green, who had purchased much of Conine’s property, likewise laid out and sold lots in 1852. The name was changed to Pataskala in 1852.

Geography
Pataskala is located at  (39.997890, -82.697411), along the South Fork of the Licking River in southwestern Licking County. Pataskala is the home of two school districts, Southwest Licking Local Schools and Licking Heights Local Schools. The Licking Heights district also serves parts of Reynoldsburg, Jefferson Township, and the city of Blacklick.

Demographics

2010 census
As of the census of 2010, there were 14,962 people, 5,588 households, and 4,132 families living in the city. The racial makeup of the city was 90.0% White, 6.0% African American, 0.3% Native American, 0.7% Asian, 0.6% from other races, and 2.5% from two or more races. Hispanic or Latino of any race were 2.0% of the population.

There were 5,588 households, of which 39.9% had children under the age of 18 living with them, 56.3% were married couples living together, 12.7% had a female householder with no husband present, 4.9% had a male householder with no wife present, and 26.1% were non-families. 20.6% of all households were made up of individuals, and 6.5% had someone living alone who was 65 years of age or older. The average household size was 2.66 and the average family size was 3.07.

The median age in the city was 35.8 years. 27.6% of residents were under the age of 18; 6.8% were between the ages of 18 and 24; 29.9% were from 25 to 44; 25.2% were from 45 to 64; and 10.6% were 65 years of age or older. The gender makeup of the city was 49.1% male and 50.9% female.

2000 census
As of the census of 2000, there were 10,249 people, 3,922 households, and 2,914 families living in the city. The population density was 359.5 people per square mile (138.8/km). There were 4,132 housing units at an average density of 144.9 per square mile (56.0/km). The racial makeup of the city was 94.6% White, 3.0% African American, 0.3% Native American, 0.5% Asian, <0.1% Pacific Islander, 0.6% from other races, and 1.0% from two or more races. Hispanic or Latino of any race were 1.0% of the population.

There were 3,922 households, out of which 38.1% had children under the age of 18 living with them, 59.9% were married couples living together, 10.7% had a female householder with no husband present, and 25.7% were non-families. 20.9% of all households were made up of individuals, and 7.8% had someone living alone who was 65 years of age or older. The average household size was 2.59 and the average family size was 3.00.

In the city, the population was spread out, with 27.8% under the age of 18, 7.1% from 18 to 24, 32.8% from 25 to 44, 22.7% from 45 to 64, and 9.5% who were 65 years of age or older. The median age was 34 years. For every 100 females, there were 95.7 males. For every 100 females age 18 and over, there were 92.7 males.

The median income for a household in the city was $51,684, and the median income for a family was $58,021. Males had a median income of $39,322 versus $30,628 for females. The per capita income for the city was $23,099. About 5.0% of families and 5.4% of the population were below the poverty line, including 4.5% of those under age 18 and 9.2% of those age 65 or over.

Education
Primary and secondary schools

The Southwest Licking Local School District has one high school (Watkins Memorial High School), one middle school (Watkins middle school), and three elementary schools (Etna, Kirkersville, Pataskala).

Licking Heights Local School District has one high school, one middle school, one intermediate school, and two elementary schools.

Private schools in the area are Liberty Christian Academy.

Post-secondary education
Central Ohio Technical College has a branch located within the city.

Public libraries
The Pataskala Public Library serves the area. The current building was dedicated in 1969 at a cost of $119,314.54. The library has over 12,000 cardholders. The library has over 70,000 items, with annual circulation topping 250,000.

Parks and recreation
Pataskala features 127 acres (0.51 km2) of parkland spread across 7 parks with wooded natural areas and river frontage. Multiple parks are located alongside the South Fork of the Licking River. The parks are spread across the city and feature athletic fields at many of the parks.

The Thomas J. Evans Foundation Park is the largest park in the city at 78 acres (0.32 km 2), 22 of which are wooded. A 1.4 mile (2.2 km) trail runs throughout the park.

Municipal Park is a 15 acre (61,000 m2) park boasting the city's pool (leased to the Pataskala Recreation Association), athletic fields, and wooded areas.

Golf courses
Pataskala has 3 golf courses within its boundaries. Broadview Golf Course, Cumberland Trail Golf Club, and Willow Run Golf Course Inc. There are an additional 46 golf courses within 20 miles (32 km) of Pataskala.

National Register of Historical Places listings 
Eleven buildings in Pataskala are listed on the National Register of Historic Places, selected by the U.S. Department of Interior in 1983.

Notable people

 Jeaniene Frost, New York Times-bestselling author of paranormal romance and urban fantasy
 John Holmes, better known as Johnny Wadd, one of the most prolific porn stars of all time, having starred in nearly 2,500 full-length films and loops; lived in Pataskala as a teenager before enlisting in the army at the age of 16
 John Reuben, a Christian rap artist signed to Gotee Records; he has a song sharing the town's name on his album Hindsight because he was born and raised there
 Robert Smith, professional ten-pin bowler who owns seven career titles on the PBA Tour; won the 2000 U.S. Open
 Chalmers Wylie, thirteen-term congressman
 Eleanor Youmans, children's author, best known for novels and short stories about cats and dogs, and winner of an Ohioana Award for juvenile fiction in 1945

References

External links
 

Cities in Licking County, Ohio
Populated places established in 1851
1851 establishments in Ohio
Cities in Ohio